Pablo S. McNeil (12 September 1939 – 4 July 2011) was a Jamaican track and field sprinter and sprinting coach. He participated in the 1964 Summer Olympics and the 1968 Summer Olympics. McNeil reached the semifinal of the 100 metres in the 1964 Olympics, finishing sixth with a wind assisted run of 10.30 seconds. He also ran as the first leg in the Jamaican 4x100 metres sprint relay team, placing fourth in the final with a time of 39.4 seconds. At his final Olympics in 1968, McNeil competed in the 100 metres once again but failed to pass the first round. His 100 metres personal best is a run of 10.54 seconds set in 1964.

Among his other sprinting achievements were a number of medals from the British West Indies Championships. He took the 200 m silver at the 1964 Championships, but his greatest haul came at the following year's event, where he finished just behind Lennox Miller for the 100 m silver medal and beat Clifton Bertrand, a two-time champion, to the 200 m gold with a run of 20.8 seconds. He represented Jamaica at the 1966 British Empire and Commonwealth Games in Kingston, Jamaica. He was part of the Jamaican 4×110 yards relay which won the silver medal and he reached the quarter-finals of both the 100-yard dash and 220 yard dash.

Following his retirement from athletics, McNeil became a sprinting coach at William Knibb Memorial High School in Trelawny Parish, Jamaica, training youths such as Usain Bolt. McNeil convinced Bolt to give up cricket in favour of track sprinting. He coached the young Jamaican throughout his high school career and their partnership came to an end when Bolt was sent to Kingston to work with the Jamaica Amateur Athletic Association at the age of 16. He intended to write a book about his time as Bolt's trainer titled The Bolt of Lightning and Me. McNeil suffered a stroke in December 2007 and his vision was from then on impaired.

References

External links
McNeil chides Johnson for Asafa comments, article from the Jamaica Observer
McNeil on Usain Bolt, article from The Guardian

1939 births
2011 deaths
Athletes (track and field) at the 1964 Summer Olympics
Athletes (track and field) at the 1968 Summer Olympics
Jamaican male sprinters
Olympic athletes of Jamaica
Athletes (track and field) at the 1966 British Empire and Commonwealth Games
Athletes (track and field) at the 1967 Pan American Games
Commonwealth Games silver medallists for Jamaica
Commonwealth Games medallists in athletics
Jamaican athletics coaches
Central American and Caribbean Games gold medalists for Jamaica
Competitors at the 1966 Central American and Caribbean Games
Central American and Caribbean Games medalists in athletics
Pan American Games competitors for Jamaica
Medallists at the 1966 British Empire and Commonwealth Games